Willis Greenleaf Calderwood (July 25, 1866 – 1956) was a Minnesota politician during the Progressive Era of American politics and was a candidate in multiple state elections in Minnesota.

Biography 
Calderwood was born on July 25, 1866 in Fox Lake, Wisconsin. 

He ran in several statewide elections in Minnesota. In 1914, he ran for governor of Minnesota on the Prohibition ticket. He only received 18,582 votes, 5.41% of the total. Soon after this loss he challenged incumbent Republican senator Knute Nelson. Calderwood ran as a member of the National Party, which was a coalition of Progressives, Socialists, and Prohibitionists. In his 1918 senate run, he once again lost.

In 1940, Calderwood published the book Temperance Facts. It was a compiled book of information on prohibition, and argued that national prohibition was a successful policy, and it would be best if reestablished. He also published many other books on the issue of Prohibition.

He died in 1956 at the age of 89.

References 

 Temperance Facts by Willis G. Calderwood 

1866 births
1956 deaths
Minnesota Prohibitionists
People from Dodge County, Wisconsin